The following lists events that happened during  1950 in New Zealand.

New Zealand entered into the Korean War – a total of 4,700 New Zealanders served in Korea. New Zealand also was involved in the Malayan Emergency.

The New Zealand Legislative Council was abolished, see Suicide squad.

The 1950 British Empire Games was held in Auckland.

Wool prices boomed, tripling during the year, due to U.S. stockpiling as a reaction to the Korean war. This was offset somewhat by increases in the prices of other (imported) commodities, but began the biggest economic boom of the 20th century in New Zealand.

Population
 Estimated population as of 31 December: 1,927,700
 Increase since 31 December 1949: 35,600 (1.88%)
 Males per 100 females: 100.7

Incumbents

Regal and viceregal
Head of State – George VI
Governor-General – Lieutenant-General The Lord Freyberg VC GCMG KCB KBE DSO

Government
The 29th New Zealand Parliament continued. In power was the newly elected National government under Sidney Holland of the National Party.

Speaker of the House – Robert McKeen then Mathew Oram
Prime Minister – Sidney Holland
Deputy Prime Minister – Keith Holyoake
Minister of Finance – Sidney Holland
Minister of Foreign Affairs – Frederick Doidge
Attorney-General – Clifton Webb
Chief Justice – Sir Humphrey O'Leary

Parliamentary opposition 
 Leader of the Opposition –  Peter Fraser (Labour) until his death on 5 August, then vacant until January 1951.

Main centre leaders
Mayor of Auckland – John Allum
Mayor of Hamilton – Harold Caro
Mayor of Wellington – Will Appleton then Robert Macalister
Mayor of Christchurch – Ernest Andrews then Robert M. Macfarlane
Mayor of Dunedin – Donald Cameron then Leonard Morton Wright

Events 
 4 January – Start of the 4th British Empire Games in Auckland.
 4 June – Butter rationing, introduced in October 1943, is abolished.

Arts and literature

See 1950 in art, 1950 in literature

Music

See: 1950 in music

Radio

See: Public broadcasting in New Zealand

Film

See: :Category:1950 film awards, 1950 in film, List of New Zealand feature films, Cinema of New Zealand, :Category:1950 films

Sport

Athletics
 George Bromley wins his third national title in the men's marathon, clocking 2:55:07 in Napier.

British Empire Games

Chess
 The 57th National Chess Championship was held in Auckland, and was won by P. Allerhand of Wellington (his second win).

Cricket

Horse racing

Harness racing
 New Zealand Trotting Cup – Chamfer
 Auckland Trotting Cup – Victory Globe

Lawn bowls
The national outdoor lawn bowls championships are held in Christchurch.
 Men's singles champion – L.J. Edwards (Balclutha Bowling Club)
 Men's pair champions – H. Hurst, E. Elwood (skip) (Christchurch RSA Bowling Club)
 Men's fours champions – E.H. Crowley, J.H. Meikle, V.F. Hurlstone, G.A. Crowley (skip) (Tolaga Bay Bowling Club)

Rugby union
The British and Irish Lions, captained by Karl Mullen, toured the country, losing three tests to the All Blacks and drawing one.

Rugby league
New Zealand national rugby league team

Soccer
 The Chatham Cup is won by Eden who beat Technical Old Boys 3–2 after extra time in the final.
 Provincial league champions:
	Auckland:	Eastern Suburbs AFC
	Canterbury:	Technical OB
	Hawke's Bay:	Watersiders
	Nelson:	Woodbourne
	Otago:	Northern AFC
	South Canterbury:	Northern Hearts
	Southland:	Brigadiers
	Taranaki:	City
	Waikato:	Claudelands Rovers
	Wanganui:	Wanganui Athletic
	Wellington:	Seatoun AFC

Births
 3 January: Robert Oliver, road and track cyclist
 5 January: Matt Robson, politician
 8 February: Peter Wells, New Zealand writer, filmmaker (d. 2019)
 26 February: Helen Clark, Prime Minister of New Zealand, 1999–2008
 6 April: Muriel Newman, politician
 29 April: Paul Holmes, radio and television broadcaster (d. 2013)
 24 May: Allison Durbin, singer
 13 June: Pete Hodgson, politician
 17 June: Lee Tamahori, film director
 24 June: David Aspin, wrestler
 1 August: John Britten, engineer and inventor (d. 1995)
 12 August: Ken Shirley, politician
 26 September: Andy Haden, rugby player (d. 2020)
 9 November: Parekura Horomia, politician (d. 2013)
 10 December: Simon Owen, golfer
 13 December: Ruth Richardson, politician
 (in Hungary): George Baloghy, painter
 David Benson-Pope, politician
 Godwin Bradbeer, painter
 Alan Duff, writer
 Stephen Franks, politician and political commentator
 Greg McGee, screenwriter and playwright
 John McKinnon, diplomat and public servant
 Judith Mayhew, lawyer and academic
 Stephen Parke, physicist
 Kura Te Waru Rewiri, painter

Deaths
 23 March: Paddy Webb, politician 
 14 July: Āpirana Ngata, Māori politician and lawyer.
 23 August: Abraham Wachner, 35th Mayor of Invercargill.
 19 November: Tom Brindle, politician and activist
 11 December: Leslie Comrie, New Zealand astronomer and computing pioneer.
 12 December: Peter Fraser, 24th Prime Minister of New Zealand.
 William Twigg-Smith, painter (in Hawaii).

References

See also
List of years in New Zealand
Timeline of New Zealand history
History of New Zealand
Military history of New Zealand
Timeline of the New Zealand environment
Timeline of New Zealand's links with Antarctica

For world events and topics in 1950 not specifically related to New Zealand see: 1950

 
Years of the 20th century in New Zealand